Liolaemus chacabucoense is a species of lizard in the family  Liolaemidae. It is native to Chile and Argentina.

References

chacabucoense
Reptiles described in 2009
Reptiles of Chile
Reptiles of Argentina